Marika Rivera (13 November 1919 – 14 January 2010) was a French-born film and stage actress and dancer.

Biography 
Rivera was born in Paris, France, the daughter of the Mexican artist Diego Rivera and his mistress, the Russian-born painter Marie Vorobieff ("Marevna"). Rivera, who was married to Angelina Beloff at the time, did not accept his daughter, so she grew up under the care of her mother. Rivera participated in dancing and acting classes from an early age; from the age of 3 she was taught dancing by Isadora Duncan. She started performing as a dancer at age 5. 

In 1938 Rivera married the painter Jean Paul Brusset, and gave birth to their son Jean Brusset in 1941.  Later she was married to Rodney Phillips, who was the owner of the Athelhampton House, Dorset, from 1949 to 1957. In Dorset she bore her second son David Phillips in 1949. David is the father of actor Jon Paul Phillips. After her second divorce she lived in Ealing in Greater London, England. 

Rivera died on 14 January 2010 at age 90, survived by her two sons.

Rivera's film credits included roles in Darling (1965), The Girl on a Motorcycle (1968), Fiddler on the Roof (1971), Percy's Progress (1974), Fellini's Casanova (1976), Voyage of the Damned (1976), Hussy (1980), The Supergrass (1985), Hôtel du Paradis (1986) and Eat the Rich (1987).

Filmography

References

External links

 Marika Rivera - Daily Telegraph obituary
 CBC News: Dancer, actress daughter of artist Diego Rivera dies
 

French film actresses
Actresses from Paris
1919 births
2010 deaths
French people of Mexican descent
French people of Russian descent
French people of Spanish-Jewish descent
French female dancers
20th-century French actresses
French emigrants to the United Kingdom